José Agustinho da Silva is an East Timorese politician and a member of the Kmanek Haburas Unidade Nasional Timor Oan (KHUNTO) political party. He is the incumbent Minister of Transport and Communications, serving since June 2018 under the VIII Constitutional Government of East Timor.

Political career
Silva first came to political prominence in the mid-2010s, when he replaced  as Secretary-General of KHUNTO.

In the 2012 East Timorese parliamentary election, KHUNTO narrowly failed to overcome the 3% electoral threshold and have two members elected to the National Parliament. Silva was the #3 candidate on KHUNTO's list for that election.

In the 2017 parliamentary election, Silva was elected to the National Parliament from #4 on the party's list. He subsequently became Chairman of the Committee for Education, Health and Social Affairs (Committee-F), and an alternate member of the Council of Administration. In September 2017, he became a substitute delegate to the National Parliamentary Group at the Parliamentary Assembly of the Community of Portuguese Language Countries (CPLP) 

In the early election in 2018, Silva was ranked #20 in the Alliance for Change and Progress (AMP), of which KHUNTO was a part, and was again elected to the National Parliament. On 22 June 2018, he was sworn in as Minister of Transport and Communications, and therefore automatically had to give up his parliamentary seat.

Silva has remained in office as Minister of Transport and Communications notwithstanding the breakdown of the Alliance for Change and Progress (AMP) coalition during the first few months of 2020, and the consequent restructuring of the government in mid-2020.

References

External links 

Government ministers of East Timor
Kmanek Haburas Unidade Nasional Timor Oan politicians
Living people
Members of the National Parliament (East Timor)
Transport and communications ministers of East Timor
Year of birth missing (living people)

21st-century East Timorese politicians